No Stranger Than Love is a 2015 Canadian romantic comedy film directed by Nick Wernham and written by Steve Adams. The film stars Alison Brie, Justin Chatwin and Colin Hanks. The film was released on June 17, 2016, in a limited release and through video on demand by Orion Pictures.

Plot summary 
Lucy Sherrington (Alison Brie), a high school art teacher living in a small town, is romantically pursued by every male she knows including students and the high school principal. Lucy turns them down because she is contemplating having an affair with the married high school football coach, Clint Coburn (Colin Hanks). In order to reassure Lucy, who is having doubts about their relationship, Clint vows not to have sex with her until she tells him she loves him. Lucy reluctantly tells him she loves him, however immediately after a black hole opens in the floor of Lucy's living room sucking in Clint.

Cast 
 Alison Brie as Lucy Sherrington
 Justin Chatwin as Rydell Whyte
 Colin Hanks as Clint Coburn
 Dylan Everett as Alex
 Terry Jones as Howard
 Aaron Poole as Jamie Whyte
 Jayne Eastwood as Brenda
 Barry Flatman as Elliot Sherrington
 Sabrina Grdevich as Nancy
 Mark Forward as Vernon Paulson
 Jonathan Potts as John Linnehan
 Robin Brûlé as Verna Coburn
 Lisa Berry as Fay

Production 
In June 2013, it was announced Alison Brie, Justin Chatwin and Colin Hanks will star in the film, with Nick Wernham directing from a screenplay by Steve Adams. Paul Fler will serve as producer, while Fred Roos, Jeffrey Latimer, Richard Wernham and Simon Wernham will serve as executive producers under their Innis Lake Entertainment and Pangaea Pictures banners, respectively.

Principal photography began on May 27, 2013, in Toronto, and concluded on July 5, 2013.

Release
The romantic comedy premiered at the Newport Beach Film Festival on April 30, 2015, as the closing night film. It was also the closing night film at Skyway Film Festival on June 14. On June 17, 2016, the film was released in select theaters in Canada, distributed by Entertainment One. On the same day, it was also released in the United States in a limited release and through video on demand by Orion Pictures and Momentum Pictures.

Critical response
On review aggregator Rotten Tomatoes, the film holds an approval rating of 7% based on 14 reviews, with an average rating of 3.57/10. On Metacritic, the film has a score of 29 out of 100, based on 8 critics. Leslie Felperin of The Hollywood Reporter gave the film a negative review writing: "It’s not a problem there’s a hole, as it were, in the common-sense logic of the film’s world; it’s that there’s a big, gaping hole where the illogic should be, a whole lot of nothing where there should be metaphor, playfulness, all that juicy, enigmatic, magical-realism stuff that helps films like Being John Malkovich and its many knockoffs become fodder for film-studies essays."

References

External links 
 
 
 

2015 films
2015 romantic comedy films
Adultery in films
Canadian romantic comedy films
2015 directorial debut films
English-language Canadian films
Films scored by Geoff Zanelli
Films shot in Toronto
2010s English-language films
2010s Canadian films